Rail transport in Catalonia operates on three rail gauges and services are operated by a variety of public operators:
Ferrocarrils de la Generalitat de Catalunya lines (FGC):
Metro de Barcelona lines
Línia Barcelona-Vallès
Llobregat–Anoia line
Broad gauge lines (Renfe):
Rodalies Barcelona lines
Regional lines ( in Catalan)
Long-distance lines
Transports Metropolitans de Barcelona lines (TMB):
Metro de Barcelona
Tramway lines:
Tramvia Blau (TMB)
Tram lines (TRAM)
High speed lines in Catalonia (Renfe)
AVE lines (in Standard gauge)
High speed trains (in broad gauge)
Funicular and aerial tramway of Catalonia (Funiculars i telefèrics de Catalunya)

Transport authorities 

Transport authorities are inter-administrative voluntary corporations responsible for coordinating the public transportation system. There are currently four transport authorities in Catalonia:
Autoritat del Transport Metropolità (ATM) in Àmbit metropolità de Barcelona (Barcelona and part of Tarragona and Girona).
Autoritat Territorial de la Mobilitat del Camp de Tarragona (ATM Camp de Tarragona) in Camp de Tarragona.
Autoritat Territorial de la Mobilitat de l'Àrea de Lleida (ATM Àrea de Lleida) in some parts of Lleida.
Autoritat Territorial de la Mobilitat de l'Àrea de Girona (ATM Àrea de Girona) ) in some parts of Comarques Gironines.
In project:
Autoritat Territorial de la Mobilitat de les Comarques Centrals (ATM Comarques Centrals) in Comarques Centrals.

Rodalies Barcelona 

Rodalies Barcelona  is the principal element of Barcelona metropolitan area transport and in some municipalities of Girona and Tarragona.

There are 15 lines (R1-R2-R3-R4-R7-R10-S1-S2-S5-S55-S1-S8-S33-R5-R6) operated by:
Renfe Operadora : 6 lines (broad gauge).
 Molins de Rei - L'Hospitalet de Llobregat - Mataró - Blanes - Maçanet-Massanes (via Barcelona Plaça Catalunya) St. Vicenç Calders - Vilanova i la Geltrú - Castelldefels - Granollers Centre - St Celoni - Maçanet-Massanes (via Bcn Passeig de Gràcia) L'Hospitalet de Llobregat - Vic  - Ripoll - Puigcerdà - La Tor de Querol (via Barcelona Plaça Catalunya) Sant Vicenç de Calders - Vilafranca del Penedès - Martorell - Terrassa - Manresa (per via Barcelona Plaça Catalunya) L'Hospitalet de Llobregat - Martorell (via Cerdanyola-Universitat and Barcelona Plaça Catalunya) Estació de França - Aeroport (via Passeig de Gràcia)Ferrocarrils de la Generalitat de Catalunya  : 4 lines (standard gauge) 5 lines (metric gauge).
FGC Línia Barcelona-Vallès:
 Barcelona Plaça Catalunya - Terrassa-Rambla
 Barcelona Plaça Catalunya - Sabadell-Rambla
 Barcelona Plaça Catalunya - Rubí
 Barcelona Plaça Catalunya - Universitat Autònoma
FGC Llobregat–Anoia line:
 Barcelona Plaça Espanya - Can Ros
 Barcelona Plaça Espanya - Olesa de Montserrat
 Barcelona Plaça Espanya - Martorell Enllaç
 Barcelona Plaça Espanya - Manresa
 Barcelona Plaça Espanya - Igualada

  

Those lines cover the four Catalan provinces; some of them go to Zaragoza (Aragón) and Castelló de la Plana and València in País Valencià. Lines are operated by:
Renfe Operadora: 8 lines (broad gauge) and one of standard gauge:
 Barcelona - Tarragona - Salou - Tortosa (with some expeditions to Vinaròs and València Nord) 
 Barcelona - Girona - Figueres - Portbou - Cervera de la Marenda (France)
 Barcelona - Tarragona - Reus - Riba-Roja d'Ebre (with some expeditions to Caspe and Zaragoza-Delicias)
 Barcelona - Lleida-Pirineus
 by Montblanc (via Reus)
 by Montblanc (via  Valls).
 by Manresa and Cervera.
 Barcelona - Puigcerdà Latour-de-Carol (France)  
 Barcelona - Caspe - Zaragoza-Delicias
 Lleida-Pirineus - Monzón - Zaragoza-Delicias
 Tortosa - L'Aldea-Amposta - València Nord
Avant  Barcelona Sants - Camp de Tarragona - Lleida-Pirineus
Ferrocarrils de la Generalitat de Catalunya: Lleida - La Pobla de Segur line is an old Renfe line that on 1 January 2005 was transferred to FGC.
 Lleida-Pirineus - Balaguer - Tremp - La Pobla de Segur 

 All Barcelona trains start in Estació de França, Sant Andreu Comtal or Barcelona Sants.
 The line was taken over by U.N. Rodalies and now is considered a Rodalies Barcelona line 3 expansion.
 The line was taken over by FGC but is operated by Renfe Operadora.

  

Some of them are high speed lines.
Estrella (120 km/h):Costa Brava: Madrid Chamartín · Alcalá de Henares · Guadalajara · Sigüenza · Arcos de Jalón · Calatayud · La Puebla de Híjar · Casp · Flix · Móra la Nova · Reus · Tarragona · Sant Vicenç de Calders · Barcelona Sants · Granollers Centre · Caldes de Malavella · Girona · Flaçà · Figueres · Llançà · Portbou · Cervera de la MarendaGalicia: Barcelona Sants · Tarragona · Reus · Lleida-Pirineus · Montsó-Riu Cinca · Saragossa-Delicias · Tudela de Navarra · Castejón de Ebro · Logronyo · Burgos · Palència · Lleó · Astorga · Ponferrada · O Barco de Valdeorras · A Rúa-Petín · San Clodio-Quiroga · Monforte de Lemos >
La Corunya branch: Sarria · Lugo · Curtis · Betanzos-Infesta · La Corunya-San Cristóbal
Vigo branch: Ourense-Empalme · Guillarei · O Porriño · Redondela de Galícia · VigoPío Baroja: Barcelona Sants · Tarragona · Reus · Lleida-Pirineus · Montsó-Riu Cinca · Saragossa-Delicias >
Bilbao branch: Tudela de Navarra · Castejón de Ebro · Calahorra · Logronyo · Miranda de Ebro · Llodio · Bilbao-Abando
Asturias branch: Tudela de Navarra · Castejón de Ebro · Calahorra · Logronyo · Miranda de Ebre · Burgos · Palència · Sahagún · Lleó · Pola de Lena · Mieres-Puente · Oviedo · Gijón-Jovellanos · Gijón-Cercanías
Hendaia branch: Tudela de Navarra · Castejón de Ebro · Tafalla · Pamplona · Alsasua · Zumárraga · Beasaín · Tolosa · Sant Sebastià · Irun · Hendaia
Salamanca branch: Tudela · Castejón de Ebro · Calahorra · Logronyo · Miranda de Ebro · Burgos · Palència · Valladolid-Campo Grande · Medina del Campo · Cantalapiedra · Salamanca
TalgoCatalà Talgo: Barcelona Sants - Montpeller-Saint RochMare Nostrum: Cartagena/Llorca - Montpeller-Saint RochMiguel de Unamuno: Barcelona Sants - País Basc/Salamanca
Barcelona Sants - Llorca
Barcelona Sants - Múrcia
Alvia
Barcelona-Sants · Camp de Tarragona · Lleida Pirineus · Saragossa-Delicias · Tudela · Castejón de Ebro · Tafalla · Pamplona · Vitoria-Gasteiz · Miranda de Ebro · Burgos · Palencia · Sahagún · León · Astorga · Bembibre · Ponferrada · O Barco de Valdeorras · A Rua-Petín · San Clodio-Quiroga · Monforte de Lemos · Ourense-Empalme · O Porriño · Redondela · Vigo
TrenhotelAntonio Machado: Barcelona-Sants · Tarragona · València-La Font de Sant Lluís · Còrdova Central · Sevilla-Santa Justa · Jerez de la Frontera · El Puerto de Santa María · CadisGibralfaro:ruta Màlaga: Barcelona Sants · Tarragona · Salou · Vinaròs · Castelló de la Plana · València Nord · Almansa · Albacete · Alcázar de San Juan · Linares-Baeza · Espeluy · Andújar · Còrdova Central · Montilla · Puente Genil · Bobadilla · Màlaga-María Zambranoruta Granada: Barcelona Sants · Tarragona · Salou · Vinaròs · Castelló de la Plana · València Nord · Almansa · Albacete · Alcázar de San Juan · Linares-Baeza · Jódar-Úbeda · Moreda · Iznalloz · GranadaJoan Miró: Barcelona Estació de França · Girona · Figueres · Limoges · Orleans-Les Aubrais · París AusterlitzPau Casals: Barcelona Estació de França · Girona · Figueres · Perpinyà · Ginebra · Lausana · Friburgo de Brisgovia · Berna · Zuric CentralSalvador Dalí: Barcelona Estació de França · Girona · Figueres · Perpinyà · Torí Porta Susa · Milà Centrale
Euromed (220 km/h):
Barcelona - Alacant: Sagrera (2010) · Barcelona Sants · Tarragona · Castelló de la Plana · València Nord · Alacant Terminal
Alaris (160–200 km/h) (490 o 120 Renfe stock):
Barcelona - València: Barcelona Estació de França · Barcelona Sants · Tarragona · Salou · L'Aldea-Amposta-Tortosa · Vinaròs · Benicarló-Peníscola · Orpesa del Mar · Benicàssim · Castelló de la Plana · Sagunt · València Nord
Barcelona - Alacant: (Estacions Alaris: Barcelona - València) · Alacant Terminal
Arco (200 km/h):García Lorca: Barcelona Sants · Sant Vicenç de Calders ·Tarragona · Salou · L'Aldea-Amposta-Tortosa · Vinaròs · Benicarló-Peñíscola · Castelló de la Plana · València Nord · Xàtiva · Albacete · Villarrobledo · Socuéllamos · Alcázar de San Juan · Extremadura / Almería / Granada / Sevilla / Màlaga

 Alta Velocidad Española 

High speed lines are operated by Renfe in a commercial branch called Alta Velocidad Española (AVE). Those lines run on new standard gauge railways.
Barcelona Sants - Zaragoza-Delicias: via Lleida-Pirineus, el Camp de Tarragona.
Barcelona Sants - Madrid-Puerta de Atocha
Barcelona Sants - Málaga-María Zambrano
Barcelona Sants - Sevilla-Santa Justa

 Railway gauge 

Most of Catalan's railway gauge is broad gauge, as in other parts of Spain, and new railways are built in standard gauge to be able to connect with European railways; therefore, some stations exist where trains can change gauges. Currently, there are only two stations in Catalonia with that capability:
 Portbou: Talgo system.
 Roda de Barà: Talgo and Brava-CAF systems.

 Metropolitan railways 

There are 11 metropolitan lines in Barcelona (L1-L2-L3-L4-L5-L6-L7-L8-L9-L10-L11) operated by:
Transports Metropolitans de Barcelona: 7 underground lines, one of them in old Spanish broad gauge (line 1); the others have standard gauge.
 (Opened on 1926 called Ferrocarril Metropolità Transversal de Barcelona) Hospital de Bellvitge - Fondo
 (Opened on 1995) Paral·lel - Badalona Pompeu Fabra
 (Opened on 1924 called Gran Metropolità de Barcelona) Zona Universitària - Trinitat Nova
 (Opened on 1973) Trinitat Nova - La Pau
 (Opened in 1969) Cornellà Centre - Vall d'Hebron
 (Line 9 will open partially in September 2009 and totally in 2014) Aeroport-Terminal sud - Can Zam
 (Line 9 branch) Zona Franca ZAL - Gorg
 (Opened in 2003) Trinitat Nova - Can Cuiàs
Ferrocarrils de la Generalitat de Catalunya:Metro del Vallès:
  (Opened in 1863) Plaça Catalunya - Reina Elisenda.
 (Opened in 1954) Plaça Catalunya - Avinguda Tibidabo.Metro del Baix Llobregat'':
 (Opened in 1912) Plaça Espanya - Molí Nou-Ciutat Cooperativa.

Territory 
Nowadays there are 32 comarcas (group of municipalities) with some kind of rail service; 14 of those have Rodalies Barcelona and/or FGC services.

 (rodalies and/or MD and/or LD):
Alt Penedès
Anoia
Bages
Baix Llobregat
Baix Penedès
Baixa Cerdanya
Barcelonès
Garraf
Maresme
Osona
Ripollès
Selva
Vallès Occidental
Vallès Oriental

 (MD or LD):
Alt Camp
Alt Empordà
Baix Camp
Baix Ebre
Conca de Barberà
Garrigues
Gironès
Montsià
Noguera
Pallars Jussà
Pla d'Urgell
Priorat
Ribera d'Ebre
Segarra
Segrià
Tarragonès
Terra Alta
Urgell

 without service:
Alt Urgell
Alta Ribagorça
Baix Empordà
Berguedà
Garrotxa
Pallars Sobirà
Pla de l'Estany
Solsonès
Vall d'Aran

References 

 
Transport in Catalonia